Latto is a Scottish name, usually a surname, and is a variation of the name Latta. Notable people with the name include:

 Latto, stage name of American rapper Alyssa Stephens
 Bill Latto (1897–1962), American football coach
 Gordon Latto (1911–1998), Scottish nutritionist
 Gordon Latto (born 1958), British ice hockey player
 Pauline Latto, British paralympic athlete
 Zena Latto (1925–2016), American jazz clarinetist and saxophonist